The Cortland Enlarged City School District is a public school district in Cortland, New York. The district consists of 6 schools and with a total enrollment of approximately 2,800 students. The Cortland City District includes the city of Cortland, the town of Virgil, and part of the town of Cortlandville.

The school board consists of 7 members.

K-6 schools
Barry Primary serves students in grades K, 1 and 2.
Smith Intermediate serves students in grades 3 & 4.
Randall Middle serves students in grades 5 & 6.

All Schools
F. S. Barry Primary School
F. E. Smith Intermediate School
Randall Mid
. Jr senior high school

References

External links
 Cortland City School Website
 https://data.nysed.gov/profile.php?instid=800000053659

School districts in New York (state)
Education in Cortland County, New York